Christopher William Nabholz (born January 5, 1967) is a former starting pitcher in Major League Baseball who played for the Montreal Expos (1990–1993), Cleveland Indians (1994), Boston Red Sox (1994) and Chicago Cubs (1995). He batted and threw left-handed. Nabholz made it to the Major Leagues after 45 minor league starts.

Biography
Nabholz grew up in Pennsylvania and idolized Steve Carlton as a youth. He graduated from Pottsville Area High School in 1985. 

He enrolled at Towson University; although he "didn't put up astronomical numbers" for the Tigers, he was named Most Valuable Player of the 1988 East Coast Conference Tournament.

In a six-season career, Nabholz posted a 37-35 record with 405 strikeouts and a 3.94 ERA in 611 innings pitched.

References

Sources

1967 births
Living people
American expatriate baseball players in Canada
Baseball players from Harrisburg, Pennsylvania
Boston Red Sox players
Charlotte Knights players
Chicago Cubs players
Cleveland Indians players
Indianapolis Indians players
Iowa Cubs players
Jacksonville Expos players
Major League Baseball pitchers
Montreal Expos players
Ottawa Lynx players
Rockford Expos players
Towson Tigers baseball players